Keith Donald (born 23 September 1940) is a Canadian rower. He competed in the men's coxless pair event at the 1960 Summer Olympics.

References

1940 births
Living people
Canadian male rowers
Olympic rowers of Canada
Rowers at the 1960 Summer Olympics
Rowers from Vancouver